The selection process for the 1936 Winter Olympics consisted of three bids, and saw Garmisch-Partenkirchen, Germany, be selected ahead of Montreal, Quebec, Canada, and St. Moritz, Switzerland. The selection was made at the 31st IOC Session in Vienna, Austria, on 10 April 1933.

References

Bids
 
1930s in Vienna
1933 in Austria
April 1933 events
Events in Vienna